Markus Rehm (born 22 August 1988) is a German athlete in disabled sports. He began in sports at age 20 and became a long jump F44 world champion in 2011. His club is TSV Bayer 04 Leverkusen and he is a medical specialist. Rehm is nicknamed "The Blade Jumper", as he is a long jumper with a blade-type leg prosthesis. Rehm's right leg was amputated below the knee after a wakeboarding accident. He uses a carbon-fibre bladed prosthesis, from which he jumps off.

He holds the long jump world record in his category (8.62 m) set at the 2021 World Para Athletics European Championships in Bydgoszcz, Poland.

Personal life
In 2005, at age 14, after a wakeboarding accident, Rehm had his right leg amputated below the knee.

Athletics career

2012 London Paralympics
Rehm won a gold medal at the 2012 Summer Paralympics in London in the long jump F42/44 classification. He made (7.35 m/1,093 points) and set a new world record. On winning he stated "I think it was the perfect jump today."

2014 German championships
However many able-bodied longjumpers protested that he had an unfair advantage due to his blade. His national title was upheld.

2014 European Athletics Championships
Rehm was banned from the 2014 European Athletics Championships, as it was ruled that his blade gave him an unfair advantage over able-bodied athletes. His blade made his amputee right leg  longer than his natural leg. Rehm jumps off with his right leg.

2015 German championships
Rehm again placed first in the long jump at the 2015 German Athletics Championships. However, his results still do not count towards winning the championship, as the German Federation has ruled that the prosthetics cannot be ruled out as providing an unfair advantage.

2015 IPC Athletics World Championships
That distance of 8.40m was enough to win the gold medal at the prior 3 Summer Olympics (2012 London, 2008 Beijing, 2004 Athens).

2016 Rio de Janeiro Olympics
Rehm attempted to qualify for the 2016 Summer Olympics, to become the second bladed athlete to compete at the Olympics, following Oscar Pistorius at the 2012 Summer Olympics. A rules change at the IAAF meant that he needed to qualify his prosthesis with the IAAF to prove that it did not provide an advantage over able-bodied athletes. A study by the University of Cologne determined that the prosthetic was a disadvantage in the run-up portion of the long jump but advantageous during the jump, however there was no overall advantage. However, the IAAF ruled that Germany failed to prove its case, and denied Rehm permission to participate at the Rio Olympics.

2016 Rio de Janeiro Paralympics
Rehm competed in the long jump T43/T44 and 4 × 100 m relay T42-47 and won both events, jumping 8.21 m in the final. He served as the flag bearer for Germany at the 2016 Summer Paralympics Parade of Nations.

2017 World Athletics Championships
Rehm will again attempt to qualify for an IAAF-sanctioned able-bodied competition, the London 2017 World Championships in Athletics. Following the 2016 Paralympics.

2021 World Para Athletics European Championships (1.06.2021 - 5.06.2021)

Markus Rehm won the long jump competition setting a new world record of 8.62m.

Results

Non-disabled sports events

Footnotes

References

External links

  
 
 
 Markus Rehm at Team Össur

1988 births
Living people
Paralympic athletes of Germany
German male sprinters
German male long jumpers
Athletes (track and field) at the 2012 Summer Paralympics
Athletes (track and field) at the 2016 Summer Paralympics
Athletes (track and field) at the 2020 Summer Paralympics
Paralympic gold medalists for Germany
Paralympic bronze medalists for Germany
Sportspeople from Leverkusen
German amputees
Medalists at the 2012 Summer Paralympics
Medalists at the 2016 Summer Paralympics
World record holders in Paralympic athletics
Medalists at the World Para Athletics Championships
Medalists at the World Para Athletics European Championships
Paralympic medalists in athletics (track and field)
Sprinters with limb difference
Long jumpers with limb difference
Paralympic sprinters
Paralympic long jumpers